The Final of the All-Ireland Senior Hurling Championship is the ultimate match in the annual hurling competition organised since 1887 by the Gaelic Athletic Association (GAA). Contested by the top hurling teams in Ireland, the tournament has taken place every year, except in 1888, when the competition was not played due to a tour of the United States by would-be competitors. The All-Ireland Senior Hurling Championship Final was listed in second place by CNN in its "10 sporting events you have to see live", after the Olympic Games and ahead of both the FIFA World Cup and UEFA European Football Championship. The most recent All-Ireland Hurling Final was held at Croke Park, Dublin, on 17 July 2022 and saw Limerick beat Kilkenny by 2 points (final score: Limerick 1-31 to Kilkenny: 2-26).

The final, held in the middle of August since the introduction of the new format in 2018, except for 2022 when it was held in the middle of July, serves as the culmination of a series of games played during the summer months, and the results determine which county's team receives the Liam MacCarthy Cup. The Championship was initially a straight knockout competition open only to the champions of each of the four provinces of Ireland. During the 1990s the competition was expanded, firstly incorporating a "back-door system" and later a round-robin group phase involving more games. The Championship currently consists of several stages. In the present format, it begins in late May with provincial championships held in Leinster and Munster. Once a team is defeated in the provincial stage they are granted one more chance to compete for the title. The Munster and Leinster champions gain automatic admission to the All-Ireland Senior Hurling Championship semi-finals, where they are joined by the two winners of the All-Ireland Senior Hurling Championship qualifiers via two lone quarter-finals.

Thirteen teams currently participate in the Championship, the most dominant teams coming from the provinces of Leinster and Munster. Kilkenny, Cork and Tipperary are considered "the big three" of hurling. Between them, these teams have won 94 out of 134 (approx 70%) championships completed during its history. The title has been won by 13 different teams, 10 of which have won the title more than once. The all-time record-holders are Kilkenny, who won their 36th title in 2015.

List of finals

Footnotes
a.  Limerick refused to play in Thurles after the original fixture on 18 February 1911 in Cork was postponed owing to the state of pitch. Kilkenny were awarded the All-Ireland title. Tipperary were nominated to play in the All-Ireland final in their absence.b.  A refixture of the All-Ireland Final was needed following an objection and a counter-objection.c.  The 1899 final was left unfinished with Tipperary being awarded the title.d.  Dublin withdrew from the field with ten minutes remaining. after Cork were awarded a disputed goal. Cork were awarded the title.e.  Cork withdrew from the field in protest at rough play by the Wexford team. Cork were awarded the title.f.  The 1888 Championship was unfinished owing to a tour of the United States by hurlers, footballers and athletes.

1997 was the first All-Ireland Hurling Final where the two competing teams came from the same province.
1975 was the first 70-minute All-Ireland Hurling Final.
1970 was the first 80-minute All-Ireland Hurling Final.
A refixture of the All-Ireland Final was needed following an objection and a counter objection.
The 1892 final was left unfinished with Cork being awarded the title.
The 1890 final was left unfinished with Cork being awarded the title.

See also
 List of All-Ireland Senior Hurling Championship semi-finals
 List of All-Ireland Senior Football Championship finals

References

 
Finals